The Apocalypse of Baruch are two different Jewish pseudepigraphical texts written in the late 1st/early 2nd century AD/CE, after the fall of Jerusalem to the Romans in 70 AD, though attributed to Baruch ben Neriah  (c. 6th century BC).

 Syriac Apocalypse of Baruch or 2 Baruch is named for the fact that it predominantly survives in Syriac manuscripts
 Greek Apocalypse of Baruch or 3 Baruch predominantly survives in Greek manuscripts

See also
Book of Baruch, also known as 1 Baruch
4 Baruch, also known as Paralipomena of Jeremiah